Boechera sparsiflora (formerly Arabis sparsiflora) is a species of rockcress known by the common names sicklepod rockcress and elegant rockcress. It is native to western North America from California to Utah to Yukon, where it can be found in a number of habitats. This is a coarsely hairy perennial herb growing one or more thick stems from a caudex. The stem may branch or not and it reaches up to 90 centimeters in maximum height. The leaves vary in shape from linear to arrowhead-like and may or may not have toothed edges. They are usually hairy and up to 8 or 10 centimeters long. The raceme inflorescence bears a number of flowers with spoon-shaped petals about a centimeter long in shades of purple or pink. The fruit is a large, curved silique 6 to 12 centimeters long.

References

External links
 
 Jepson Manual Treatment
 USDA Plants Profile
 
 Photo gallery
 Boechera sparsiflora at The Plant List

sparsiflora
Flora of North America
Plants described in 2001